The year 1624 in music involved some significant events.

Events
Antonio Bertali is employed as court musician in Vienna by Emperor Ferdinand II.

Publications 
Juan Arañés – 
Thomas Elsbeth –  for five voices (Freiberg: Georg Hoffmann), a wedding song
Melchior Franck
 for four voices (Coburg: Johann Forckel), a funeral motet
 for five voices (Coburg: Fürstliche Druckerei), a wedding motet for Johann Forckel, his printer
 for twelve voices in two choirs (Coburg: Johann Forckel), a wedding motet
Girolamo Frescobaldi – 
Sigismondo d'India
Seventh book of madrigals for five voices (Rome: Giovanni Battista Robletti)
Eighth book of madrigals for five voices and basso continuo (Rome: Giovanni Battista Robletti)
Giovanni Girolamo Kapsberger –  (Rome: Luca Antonio Soldi), a collection of songs by Pope Urban VIII
Francis Pilkington – The second set of madrigals, and pastorals, of 3. 4. 5. and 6. parts (London: Thomas Snodham)
Samuel Scheidt – , three books of organ music

Classical music 
Claudio Monteverdi – Il Combattimento di Tancredi e Clorinda
Johann Ulrich Steigleder – Ricercar Tabulatura

Opera

Births
Giovanni Antonio Pandolfi Mealli (1624-1687)
date unknown
Francesco Provenzale, composer (died 1704)
François Roberday, organist and composer (died 1680)

Deaths
February 4 – Vicente Espinel, writer and guitarist (born 1550)
October – Marcantonio Negri, composer, singer and musical director
November 14 – Costanzo Antegnati, Italian organ builder, organist and composer

 
Music
17th century in music
Music by year